Berželė (formerly) is a village in Kėdainiai district municipality, in Kaunas County, central Lithuania. According to the 2011 census, the village has a population of 47 people.

Geography 

Berželė is located 3 km to the South from town of Surviliškis, near the road which connects Kėdainiai and Krekenava. Also there are local road to Šlapaberžė. The small rivulet of Kruostas crosses the village. It is a right tributary of the Nevėžis River. There is the Kalnaberžė forest to the West from Berželė.

History
Berželė village was mentioned first time in 1572.

Etymology 
The name Berželė comes from a Lithuanian name beržas for a birch tree. Once, a large birch forest covered the area and a lot of locations were named with the root berž-, like Kalnaberžė, Šlapaberžė, Beržai, Paberžė.

Demography

Images

References

Villages in Kaunas County
Kėdainiai District Municipality